Almahmoud (1947–1971) was an American Thoroughbred racemare that was best known as an influential broodmare who produced Natalma and Cosmah.

She was sired by the 1936 Epsom Derby winner Mahmoud, who was imported to the United States in 1940 by Cornelius Vanderbilt Whitney. Her dam was the unraced mare, Arbitrator, a daughter of the 1934 Belmont Stakes winner, Peace Chance. Almahmoud won important races at ages two and three before retiring to broodmare duty.

Stud record
Almahmoud was the dam of the following foals:
 Armistice (1956) gelding by Citation, one win
 Bubbling Beauty (1961) filly by Hasty Road, dam of Arctic Tern 
  Cosmah (1953) by Cosmic Bomb, was the 1974 Kentucky Broodmare of the Year and dam of Queen Sucree (dam of Kentucky Derby winner Cannonade) and Halo (sired Kentucky Derby winner Sunny's Halo and U.S. Racing Hall of Fame inductee, Sunday Silence). 
 Folk Dancer (1959) by Native Dancer, a winner 
 Retinoscope (1958) by Helioscope, placed once
 Nash 1960 gelding by Nashua, won 11 races
 Natalma by Native Dancer, 3 wins and stakes placed, dam of Northern Dancer who the National Thoroughbred Racing Association and others have called "one of the most influential sires in Thoroughbred history" 
 Ramadan, colt by Native Dancer, won 1 race

References

Pedigree

External links
 Almahmoud female line

1947 racehorse births
1971 racehorse deaths
Racehorses bred in Kentucky
Racehorses trained in the United States
Thoroughbred family 2-d